Jesal Toral is a 1971 Indian Gujarati devotional film written and directed by Ravindra Dave. It proved to be one of the biggest hits of Gujarati cinema and ran for 25 weeks in theatres.

Cast
 Anupama as Toral
 Upendra Trivedi as Jesal
 Arvind Trivedi
 Ramesh Mehta
 Jayant Bhatt
Mulraj Rajda
 Mukund Pandya
 Laxmi Patel
 Sarala Dand
 Induben Rajda
 Lily Patel
 Vandana
Suryakant Mandhare
 Umakant
 Veljibhai Gajjar
Jayshree T. (guest appearance)

Production
Ravindra Dave had planned to remake his Hindi blockbuster film Nagina (1951) with Leena Chandavarkar and Sanjay Khan, but the project was delayed. As a result, he turned his production crew to Gujarati cinema to keep them employed.

The film is based on local folk legend of bandit Jesal Jadeja who was preached and reformed by Kathi saint-woman Toral. Their memorial shrines are located in Anjar in Kutch district, Gujarat. It was the first Eastmancolor Gujarati film and was a debut film of Upendra Trivedi and Ramesh Mehta. It was shot in Orvo technicolor. As the Laxmi Studio at Baroda was not yet commissioned, the film was partly shot in Kutch and partly in Mumbai.

Soundtrack

Release and reception
The film was released in 1971. The film was exempted from the tax by the Government of Gujarat to encourage production of the Gujarati films.

The film proved to be one of the biggest hits of Gujarati cinema and ran for 25 weeks in theatres. It won 17 awards from the Government of Gujarat. The film is considered to have revived the Gujarati cinema. Dave went on to direct more than 25 Gujarati films and never returned to Hindi cinema.

References

External links 
 

1971 films
Films set in Gujarat
Films shot in Mumbai
Films shot in Gujarat
Films based on Indian folklore
1970s Gujarati-language films